Administration Building may refer to:

Canada

Saskatchewan
Administration Building, University of Saskatchewan

United States

California
 Administration Building, Treasure Island, Treasure Island, California
 Atascadero Administration Building, Atascadero, CA
 Riverside County Administration Building, Riverside, California

Florida
 Administration Buildings (Boca Raton, Florida)
 Croissant Park Administration Building, Fort Lauderdale, Florida
 Opa-Locka Company Administration Building, Opa-Locka, Florida

Idaho
Administration Building, University of Idaho, Moscow, ID

Indiana
 Administration Building, Indiana Central University, Indianapolis, IN
 Main Administration Building (University of Notre Dame), South Bend, Indiana

Illinois
Sears, Roebuck and Company Administration Building, Chicago

Kansas
 Administration Building (McConnell Air Force Base), Wichita, Kansas

Maryland
 Victor Cullen Center, Old Administration Building, Sabillasville, Maryland

Minnesota
Administration Building-Girls' Dormitory, Minnesota School for the Deaf, Faribault, Minnesota
Administration Building-Minnesota State Public School For Dependent and Neglected Children, Owatonna, MN
 Holman Field Administration Building, Saint Paul, Minnesota
 Theodore Wirth House-Administration Building, Minneapolis, Minnesota

Mississippi
Aubrey K. Lucas Administration Building (University of Southern Mississippi)

Missouri
Administration Building, Missouri State Fruit Experiment Station, Mountain Grove, Missouri

Montana
 Administration Building (Fort Peck, Montana)

Nebraska
 Eugene C. Eppley Administration Building, Omaha, Nebraska

New Mexico
 Administration Building (Alamogordo, New Mexico) (New Mexico School for the Blind and Visually Impaired
 Administration Building (Portales, New Mexico), (Eastern New Mexico University)

New York
 Buffalo Psychiatric Center - Administration Building, Buffalo, New York
 Fonthill Castle and the Administration Building of the College of Mount St. Vincent, The Bronx, New York, New York

Ohio
 Administration Building (Lake Erie College), Painesville, Ohio
 Akron-Fulton International Airport Administration Building, Akron, Ohio

Oklahoma
Administration Building-Post Hospital, Fort Gibson, Oklahoma
Administration Building (Wilburton, Oklahoma)

Oregon
 Inlow Hall (Eastern Oregon University)

Pennsylvania
Administration Building, Washington and Jefferson College, Washington, Pennsylvania

Puerto Rico
 Administration Building (Santurce, Puerto Rico)

South Carolina
 Chappelle Administration Building, Columbia, South Carolina

Texas
 Administration Building (Austin, Texas), a historic building of Huston-Tillotson University
 Administration Building (Decatur Baptist College), Decatur, Texas
 Hugh Roy and Lillie Cullen Building, Georgetown, Texas, a historic building of Southwestern University
 Administration Building (Texas Tech University), Lubbock, Texas
 Administration Building (Randolph Air Force Base), Universal City, Texas

Utah
Church Administration Building, Salt Lake City, Utah
 Old Administration Building (Bryce Canyon National Park), Bryce Canyon, Utah

Washington
Gerberding Hall, formerly the Administration Building, at the University of Washington
King County Administration Building, Seattle, Washington

Washington D.C.
Administration Building, Carnegie Institution of Washington, Washington, D.C.

See also
Main Building (disambiguation)
Old Main, also used similarly for main buildings of universities